The 2002 Yonex All England Open was the 92nd edition of the All England Open Badminton Championships. It was held from 5 to 9 March 2002, in Birmingham, England. The scoring system changed to the first player to reach seven points over five sets. This change was brought in for the benefit of the viewing public and television cameras but it proved to be unpopular and soon reverted to the original scoring system.

It was a four star tournament and the prize money was US$125,000.

Venue
National Indoor Arena

Final results

Men's singles

Section 1

Section 2

Women's singles

Section 1

Section 2

References

External links
Results 2002 All England Open

All England Open Badminton Championships
All England Open
All England
Sports competitions in Birmingham, West Midlands
March 2002 sports events in the United Kingdom